The C family was Mazda's first large piston engine design. It is not certain whether Mazda has a name for this collection of engines, and it is uncertain precisely which ones are related.

PC

The  PC engine featured a  bore and stroke. It was an eight-valve SOHC design and was designed for rear wheel drive longitudinal applications.

Applications:
 1965-1967 Mazda Familia 1000 Coupé
 1977-1983 Mazda Familia/323 (FA4P)

TC
The  TC had a  bore and stroke; a bored and stroked version of the PC.  Used in the 1970, 1973, and 1977 Mazda Familia, and the 1979 - 1984 Mazda Bongo / Ford Econovans as the smaller engine option, the larger being the 1.6 L Mazda NA engine. For 1977 a new, prize-winning lean burn version of the TC was developed for the new FA-series Familia, using a carburetor with an EGR valve. Thus equipped, the TC weighs .

Applications:
 1970-1977 Mazda Familia/Familia Presto/Mazda 1300
 1971-1978 Mazda Grand Familia/808/818/Mizer
 1972-1975 Mazda B-Series/Ford Courier
 1977.01-1980.06 Mazda Familia/323 FA4TS
 1977–1985.12 Mazda Familia Cargo/323 Station Wagon FA4TV
 1977.10-19?? Mazda Bongo BA2T8
 1974.10 - 1981.12 Kia Brisa
 1982.03-1984 Saehan/Daewoo Maepsy

UC
  - A larger-bored version of the TC, used in the 1978-1980 Mazda GLC. Produced . This was also used in the 1979-1984 E1400/Econovan and for the new 1984 Ford Econovan as the base model engine. In continental Europe the Econovan/Mazda E-series continued to use the UC engine until at least 1990, in a version which produces . In some parts documentations, it is referred to as the D4, however no UC engine block was ever stamped D4. in 1980, this engine (and the smaller TC) was modernized and turned into the new E-series engine, intended for front-wheel drive applications.

UB
The original 1966 Luce 1500 used a  SOHC inline-four with square  bore and stroke. This engine, also used in the Capella and Grand Familia for a short while, was replaced by the stroked NA engine (below).

Applications:
 1966-1972 Mazda Luce 1500 SUA, SUAV
 1970-1973 Mazda Capella SU2A
 1971-1973 Mazda Grand Familia S/808/818 SU4A, SU4V

NA
The rest of the world received a  version. Later on, this engine was also referred to as H6.

Applications:
 1973.11-1978 Mazda Grand Familia/808/818 SN3A, SN4A
 1974-1977 Mazda 808 (US)
 1977-198? Mazda B1600/Proceed PE2N
 1970.05-1978.09 Mazda Capella/616 SNA
 1978.10-1982.09 Mazda Capella/626 CB2NS

VB
A stroked to   version of the UB/NA, retaining the same  bore, was used in the 1968-1972 Luce 1800 and the 1975-1979 Mazda B1800s for the US market. In Canadian market B-series trucks, it was installed as early as 1970. Export model outputs varied, with European market models claiming  DIN (all other figures remaining the same).

 1968-1972 Mazda Luce / 1800 SVA
 1970-1977 Mazda B1800 (BVD61, North America)
 1977-1979 Mazda B1800 (US)
 1972-1979 Ford Courier

See also
 Mazda engines

References

C
Straight-four engines
Gasoline engines by model